Luke Jarrod McKenzie (born 26 July 1981) is an Australian professional triathlete who specializes in long distance, non-drafting triathlon events. In 2013 he took second place at the Ironman World Championship.

Career
McKenzie was born and raised in Taree, New South Wales where he grew up participating in a variety of sports including cricket, water polo, and golf. His first introduction and interest in triathlon came from volunteering at a marathon aid station in Forster during Ironman Australia with his family for a few years of his childhood in the late 1980s. At age 13, his family moved to the Gold Coast which exposed to him to a higher caliber triathlon, swimming, and surfing environment. His talent as a swimmer was good enough to warrant training with an Olympic coach. Swimming also led to surf lifesaving competitions and cross country running. There was a triathlon club that trained at the same time and at the same pool where he swam. McKenzie approached the team coach and asked to join their squad and was accepted. In the very first race he entered, a junior sprint; which lasted 15 minutes, he took first place.

McKenzie was picked to train at Australia's newly created national triathlon performance center. Throughout high school he trained alongside future champions Mirinda Carfrae, Emma Snowsill, and Annabel Luxford. In 1997, he reached his first world junior championships in duathlon and at 19 he placed third at the 2001 ITU World Junior Championships. The following year, with the Athens Olympic Games two years away, McKenzie was unsure his current pursuit of draft-legal, Olympic style racing was going to result in him qualifying the games. Under the advisement of training partner Michellie Jones, he and Craig Alexander moved into an apartment in Carlsbad, California and trained, focusing on non-draft style racing.

In his career leading up to the 2013 Ironman World Championship, McKenzie had won six previous Ironman competitions. He led the 2013 championship race up until mile 16 of the marathon before being passed by eventual champion Frederik Van Lierde but held on to finish second.

Personal life
McKenzie was married to pro triathlete Amanda Balding from October 2010 to March  2013. Pro triathlete, Beth Gerdes gave birth to their daughter, Wynne, in May 2014. Luke and Beth have subsequently been married.

Notable results
McKenzie's notable race results include:

References

External links

ITU Results

1981 births
Living people
Australian male triathletes
Sportsmen from New South Wales
People from Taree
20th-century Australian people
21st-century Australian people